Sonchus adscendens is a species of plant in the Sonchus genus. It was first published in Prodr. 6: 303 in 1838.

References 

adscendens